The Paul Revere House, built c.1680, was the colonial home of American patriot and Founding Father Paul Revere during the time of the American Revolution. A National Historic Landmark since 1961, it is located at 19 North Square, Boston, Massachusetts, in the city's North End, and is now operated as a nonprofit museum by the Paul Revere Memorial Association. An admission fee is charged.

History
The original three-story house was built about 1680, making it the oldest house in downtown Boston. It occupied the former site of the Second Church of Boston's parsonage, home to Increase Mather and Cotton Mather, which was destroyed in the Great Fire of 1676. Its first owner was Robert Howard, a wealthy slave merchant. His L-shaped townhouse contained spacious rooms and would have been enhanced by exterior features such as a second-floor overhang and casement windows.

As is typical of early Massachusetts Bay timber construction, the main block of the three-story dwelling consisted of four structural bays demarcated by heavy framing posts and overhead beams. The larger ground-floor room in this main block was dominated by its chimney bay and adjoining lobby entrance. Although some contemporary Boston houses had separate kitchen buildings, the two-story extension behind the Revere House was typical. As the Revere House was set quite close to neighbors, its double casement windows were installed in the rear elevation rather than the more common placement in a gable.

Around the middle of the eighteenth century, the Paul Revere House went through two major renovations. First, the roofline facing the street was raised substantially to bring the house in line with the Georgian architectural style that had become prevalent at that time (the roofline was returned to its original pitch, albeit without a gable, by the restorers in 1907–1908, which gave rise to a commonly held misconception that the attic had been removed). Second, a two-story lean-to was added in the ell between the two 17th-century portions of the house (this lean-to was removed by the restoration in 1907–1908).

Paul Revere owned this house from 1770 to 1800, although he and his family may have lived elsewhere for periods in the 1780s and 1790s. It is believed that during the Revere occupancy the rear chimney was added (c. 1790) including the kitchen that visitors see in the first room they enter.

After Revere sold the house, it became a tenement with its ground floor remodeled for use as shops, including at various times a candy store, cigar factory, bank and vegetable and fruit business. In 1902, Revere's great-grandson, John P. Reynolds Jr. purchased the building to prevent demolition, and restoration took place under the guidance of architect and historic preservationist Joseph Everett Chandler. In April 1908, the Paul Revere House opened its doors to the public as one of the earliest historic house museums in the United States.

Despite the substantial renovation process which returned the house to its conjectured appearance around 1700, ninety percent of the structure (including two doors, three window frames, and portions of the flooring, foundation, inner wall material and raftering) is original to 1680, though none of the window glass is original. Its heavy beams, large fireplaces, and absence of interior hallways are typical of colonial living arrangements. The two chambers upstairs contain several pieces of furniture believed to have belonged to the Revere family.

Immediately adjacent (across the entry courtyard, the original site of the John Barnard House) is the brick Pierce–Hichborn House, built about 1711 as an early Georgian house, and also operated as a nonprofit museum by the Paul Revere Memorial Association.

In December 2016 the Paul Revere Memorial Association opened a 3,500 square foot visitor and education center connected to the house by an elevated walkway. Purchased in 2007, $4 million in renovations allow the new education center to provide additional exhibit space on Revere's Midnight Ride, his work as a silversmith and his industrial work after the American Revolution. The renovations permit wheelchair users to access the second floor of the house for the first time while classrooms and a library will allow for expanded research and educational outreach.

See also 
 List of National Historic Landmarks in Boston
 National Register of Historic Places listings in northern Boston

References
Notes

Further reading
 Nina Zannieri. Report from the Field: Not the Same Old Freedom Trail: A View from the Paul Revere House. The Public Historian, Vol. 25, No. 2 (Spring, 2003), pp. 43–53.

External links

 Boston National Historical Park Official Website
 Paul Revere House Website
 Historic American Buildings Survey, Library of Congress. Paul Revere House, 19 North Square, Boston, Suffolk County, MA
 Google news archive

Paul Revere
Biographical museums in Massachusetts
Boston National Historical Park
Historic house museums in Massachusetts
Houses completed in 1680
Houses in Boston
Landmarks in North End, Boston
Museums in Boston
National Historic Landmarks in Boston
1680 establishments in Massachusetts
Houses on the National Register of Historic Places in Suffolk County, Massachusetts
Timber framed buildings in the United States
National Register of Historic Places in Boston